Fenella is a genus of sawflies belonging to the family Tenthredinidae.

Species:
 Fenella arenariae
 Fenellacatenata
 Fenellacontinuata

References

Tenthredinidae
Sawfly genera